Boris is a given name (see: Boris (given name)).

This is a list of people with given name Boris, sorted by surname.

Rulers, nobles and saints
 Knyaz Boris I of Bulgaria (?–889), canonized after his death
 Tsar Boris II (931–977), ruler of the First Bulgarian Empire
 Tsar Boris III (1894–1943), ruler of the Kingdom of Bulgaria
 Grand Duke Boris Vladimirovich of Russia
 Boris and Gleb, Russian princes; murdered 1015; first Russian saints
 Boris, Prince of Turnovo

A
 Boris Alexandrov (1905–1994), Soviet composer
 Boris Alexandrov, (1955–2002), Ice hockey player.

B
 Boris Barnet, Soviet film director
 Boris Becker (born 1967), German professional tennis player
 Boris Bede, French player of gridiron football
 Boris Berezovsky, Russian pianist
 Boris Berezovsky, Russia's first billionaire businessman
 Boris Berman, Russian pianist
 Boris Blank, Swiss artist and musician
 Boris Bondarev (born 1980), former Russian diplomat
 Boris Brejcha, German DJ and music producer

C
 Boris Christoff, Bulgarian opera singer

D
 Boris Daenen, electronic music producer and DJ known as Netsky
 Boris Diaw, French basketball player
 Boris Dlugosch, house music producer
 Boris Dvornik, Croatian actor
 Boris Drangov, Bulgarian colonel and warfare pedagogue

E
 Boris Ebzeyev, Karachay politician and judge, president of Karachay–Cherkessia and one of the principal commanders of Insurgency in the North Caucasus

F
 Boris Ford, British literary critic and educationalist
 Boris Furlan, Slovenian jurist and politician

G
 Boris Gardiner, Jamaican singer-songwriter and bass guitarist
 Boris Gelfand, Israeli chess grandmaster
 Boris Godunov, Tsar of Russia during the late 16th and early 17th centuries
 Boris Gromov, Russian military and political figure, Governor of Moscow Oblast, one of the principal commanders of Soviet-Afghan War
 Boris M. Gombač, Slovenian historian
 Boris Grebenshchikov, Russian singer-songwriter; band leader of Aquarium
 Boris Grishayev, Soviet marathon runner
 Boris Gryzlov, Russian politician, Interior Minister, Speaker of the State Duma, one of the leaders of United Russia
 Boris Mikhaylovich Gurevich (1937–2020), Soviet Olympic champion wrestler

H
 Boris Henry (born 1973), retired German javelin thrower
 Boris Hoppek (born 1970), German contemporary artist
 Boris Hybner (1941–2016), Czech actor, director, and mime artist

J
 Boris Jacobsohn (1918–1966), American physicist
 Boris Johnson (born 1964), former Prime Minister of the United Kingdom and former Mayor of London
 Boris Jordan (born 1966), American investor involved in the privatization in Russia in the early 1990s
 Boris Jovanović (born 1972), Serbian footballer

K
 Boris Kagarlitsky, Russian academic and political dissident
 Boris Kalin, Slovenian sculptor
 Boris Karloff (1887–1969), English actor; appeared in many horror films
 Boris Khmelnitsky, Russian actor 
 Boris Kidrič, Slovenian communist official and resistance leader
 Boris Klyuyev (1944–2020), Russian actor
 Boris Kodjoe, American actor
 Boris Kollár, Slovakian businessman and politician
 Boris Kravtsov (born 1922), Russian jurist and politician
 Boris Kustodiev, Russian artist and painter
 Boris Kočí (born 1964), Czech former football player
 Boris Krajný (born 1945), Czech pianist

L
 Boris Lushniak, retired United States Public Health Service Commissioned Corps rear admiral who served as the acting Surgeon General of the United States
 Boris Lyatoshinsky, Ukrainian composer

M
 Boris Maciejovsky, Austrian behavioral scientist
 Boris Messerer (born 1933), Soviet and Russian theater artist, set designer and teacher
 Boris Miletić (born 1975), Croatian politician and mayor of Pula
 Boris Mikšić, Croatian businessman and politician

N
 Boris Nachamkin (1933–2018), American basketball player
 Boris Nayfeld, Belarusian gangster
 Boris Nemtsov, Russian scientist and politician

O
 Boris Ord, British organist and choirmaster

P
 Boris Pahor (1913–2022), Slovenian writer
 Boris Paichadze, Georgian football player
 Boris Palmer (born 1972), German politician
 Boris Pasternak, Soviet author; recipient, 1958 Nobel Prize in Literature
 Boris Perušič (born 1940), Czech former volleyball player
 Boris Petrovsky (1908–2004), Russian surgeon and Soviet minister of health
 Boris Plotnikov (1949–2020), Russian actor
 Boris Podrecca (born 1940), Slovenian-Italian architect
 Boris Polak (born 1954), Israeli world champion and Olympic sport shooter
 Boris Pugo (1937–1991), Soviet Communist politician of Latvian origins

R
 Boris Razinsky (1933–2012), Soviet Olympic footballer and manager
 Boris Roatta (1980–1994), French child actor
 Boris Rösner (1951–2006), Czech actor

S
 Boris Said, American race car driver
 Boris Sarafov, Bulgarian Army officer and revolutionary
 Boris Shcherbina, Ukrainian Soviet politician who supervised the crisis management of both the 1986 Chernobyl disaster and the 1988 Armenian earthquake
 Boris Serebryakov, Soviet serial killer and mass murderer known as the "Kuybyshev Monster"
 Boris Shaposhnikov, Soviet Russian general, Chief of the Staff of the Red Army, and Marshal of the Soviet Union, one of the principal commanders Eastern Front and Battle of Moscow 
 Count Boris Sheremetev, Russian diplomat and general field marshal during the Great Northern War
 Boris Sidis, Ukrainian psychiatrist
 Boris Spassky, Russian chess player
 Boris Starling, British novelist and screenwriter
 Boris Stürmer (1848–1917), Russian lawyer, Master of Ceremonies at the Russian Court, district governor of German descent, member of the Russian Assembly, Prime Minister of Russia, Minister of Internal Affairs and Foreign Minister of the Russian Empire
 Borys Szyc, Polish actor

T
 Boris Tadić (born 1958), Yugoslav-Serb politician; former President of Serbia
 Borys Tarasyuk, Ukrainian politician
 Boris Titulaer, Dutch singer
 Boris Trajkovski, politician; former President of Macedonia

U-V
 Boris Vallejo, fantasy artist
 Boris van der Ham (born 1973), Dutch politician and actor
 Boris Vladimirov, Soviet Army lieutenant general and a Hero of the Soviet Union
 Boris Vian, French polymath

W
 Boris Williams, British musician; former member of The Cure

X-Y
 Boris Yeltsin (1931–2007), Soviet-Russian politician; first President of Russia, one of the principal commanders of Second Chechen War

Z
 Boris Žabka (born 1977), Slovak ice hockey coach
 Boris Zaitchouk, Soviet hammer thrower
 Boris Zeisser (born 1968), Dutch architect
 Boris Zhukov (born 1959), stage name for American professional wrestler James Kirk Harrell
 Boris Živković, Croatian footballer

Boris